The pharyngeal tubercle is a part of the occipital bone of the head and neck. It is located on the lower surface of the basilar part of occipital bone. It is the site of attachment of the pharyngeal raphe.

Structure 
The pharyngeal tubercle is located on the lower surface of the basilar part of occipital bone. This about 1 cm anterior to the foramen magnum.

Function 
The pharyngeal tubercle gives attachment to the fibrous raphe of the pharynx, also known as the pharyngeal raphe. This connects with the superior pharyngeal constrictor muscle.

See also 
 Clivus (anatomy)

References

External links 
 
 

Bones of the head and neck